Pierre Cuillier-Perron (1753 to 1755–1834), French military adventurer in India born Pierre Cuillier (or Cuellier) at Luceau near Château-du-Loir, the son of a cloth merchant. In India, he changed his name to Perron (a diminutive of Pierre). He was generally referred to by his contemporaries and posterity as General Perron.

In 1780 he went out to India as a sailor on a French frigate, deserted on the Malabar coast, and made his way to upper India, where he enlisted in the rana of Gohad's corps under a Scotsman named Sangster. In 1790 he took service under De Boigne, and was appointed to the command of his second brigade.

In 1795 he assisted the Maratha forces to win the battle of Kardla against the nizam of Hyderabad, and on De Boigne's retirement became commander-in-chief of Maratha general Mahadji Sindhia's army. At the battle of Malpura (1800) he defeated the Rajput forces.

After the battle of Ujjain (1801) he refused to send his troops to the aid of Scindia. His treachery on this occasion shook his position, and on the outbreak of war between Scindia and the British in 1803 Perron was superseded and fled to the British camp.

In the battles of Delhi, Laswari, Ally Ghur (now Aligarh) and Assaye, Perron's battalions were completely destroyed by Lord Lake and Sir Arthur Wellesley. He returned to France with a large fortune, and died in 1834.

Buildings
Sir Shah Sulaiman Hall's main Building, which currently serves as the Provost Office (Administrative Block), was built by a him in year 1802.

The palatial home he built for himself at Chinsurah was to house Hooghly College (Hooghly Mohsin College) from 1837 to 1937.

References

Herbert Compton, A particular account of the European military adventurers of Hindustan, from 1784 to 1803 (1892).

1755 births
1834 deaths
French sailors
French mercenaries
Mercenaries in India
People from Sarthe
People of the Second Anglo-Maratha War